Oleksiy Kruhliak (9 December 1975 – 16 May 2017) was a Ukrainian fencer. He competed in the individual and team foil events at the 2000 Summer Olympics.

References

External links
 

1975 births
2017 deaths
Ukrainian male foil fencers
Olympic fencers of Ukraine
Fencers at the 2000 Summer Olympics